Scott Ryan may refer to:
 Scott Ryan (actor), Australian actor and writer
 Scott Ryan (Australian politician) (born 1973), Australian High Commissioner to Canada
 Scott Ryan (Ohio politician) (born 1965), member of the Ohio House of Representatives

See also
 
 Ryan Scott (disambiguation)